Vilhena Esporte Clube, commonly referred to as Vilhena, was a Brazilian professional club based in Vilhena, Rondônia founded on 3 June 1991.

History
The club was founded on September 7, 1974. Vilhena won the Campeonato Rondoniense in 2005, in 2009, in 2010 and in 2013. The club competed in the Série D in 2010, when they were eliminated in the First Stage. Vilhena, after winning the state championship for the fifth time, qualified to compete in the 2013 Série D, but they decided to not compete in league.

Stadium
Vilhena Esporte Clube played their home games at Estádio Portal da Amazônia. The stadium has a maximum capacity of 7,000 people.

Honours
 Campeonato Rondoniense
 Winners (5): 2005, 2009, 2010, 2013, 2014

References

External links
 Vilhena on Globo Esporte

Defunct football clubs in Rondônia
Association football clubs established in 1991
Association football clubs disestablished in 2019
1991 establishments in Brazil
2019 disestablishments in Brazil